The 2019 AFC Futsal Club Championship was an international futsal tournament held in Thailand from 7 to 17 August 2019. The 16 clubs involved in the tournament were required to register a squad of 14 players, minimum two of whom must be goalkeepers (Regulations Articles 30.1 and 30.2). Only players in these squads were eligible to take part in the tournament.

The position listed for each player is per the squad list in the official match reports by the AFC. Flags indicate national team as defined under FIFA eligibility rules. Players may hold more than one non-FIFA nationality. A flag is included for coaches that are of a different nationality than their own club's nationality.

Group A

Port FC
Manager: Udom Taveesuk

The final squad was announced on 3 August 2019.

Osh EREM
Manager: Daniar Abdyraimov

The final squad was announced on 5 August 2019.

Shenzhen Nanling Tielang
Manager:  Jurandir Dutra

The final squad was announced on 6 August 2019.

FS Seoul
Manager: Lee Chang-hwan

Group B

Thái Sơn Nam
Manager: Phạm Minh Giang

The final squad was announced on 5 August 2019.

Naft Al-Wasat
Manager: Haitham Abbas Bawei

Al-Rayyan
Manager:  Carlos Núñez

AGMK
Manager: Aleksandr Petrov

Group C

Bank of Beirut
Manager: Alexandre Cafu

The 15-man preliminary squad was announced on 31 July 2019.

Vamos Mataram
Manager:  Reza Fallahzadeh

The 15-man preliminary squad was announced on 1 August 2019. The final squad was announced on 8 August.

Soro Company
Manager: Pairav Vohidov

Victoria University College
Manager: Htay Myint

The final squad was announced on 6 August 2019.

Group D

Mes Sungun
Manager: Esmaeil Taghipour

The final squad was announced on 6 August 2019.

Nagoya Oceans
Manager:  Juan Fuentes

The final squad was announced on 5 August 2019.

Al-Dhafrah
Manager:  Rui Guimarães

Kazma
Manager:  Tiago Polido

References

External links
 Official AFC Futsal Club Championship website

Club Championship squads